Donna Etiebet (born 29 April 1986) is a British rower. In the 2016 World Rowing Championships, she won a gold medal in the women's coxless four event with Fiona Gammond, Holly Nixon and Holly Norton.

References

See also

British female rowers
World Rowing Championships medalists for Great Britain
Living people
1986 births